RMMV Athlone Castle was a British passenger liner built by Harland & Wolff for the Union-Castle Line's mail service from Southampton to Cape Town, South Africa route. After she was launched on November 28, 1935, she sailed on her maiden voyage on May 22, 1936. She served as a troopship during world war two and in 1965 was scrapped at Kaohsiung.

Design
The 25,564 GRT motor ship Athlone Castle was built at the Harland & Wolff shipyard in Belfast, Northern Ireland. The ship, 220.98 meters long and 25.15 meters wide had a funnel, two masts, and two propellers. The ship was powered by two 10 cylinder Burmeister & Wain diesel engines developing 24,000 bhp and a speed of 19.5 knots. The passenger accommodations were designed for 246 passengers in first class and 538 in cabin class. The ship was named after the castle of the same name in Athlone (Ireland). The Athlone Castle was the sister ship of the identical RMMV Stirling Castle and RMMV Capetown Castle, which was also launched by Harland & Wolff on July 15, 1935, while Capetown Castle was Launched on 23 September 1937.

History
Launched on November 28, 1935, Athlone Castle was christened by Princess Alice, Countess of Athlone. The ship was completed on May 13, 1936. On May 22, 1936, the Athlone Castle left Southampton for her maiden voyage to Cape Town, where she arrived on June 7. When she arrived in Cape Town on April 14, 1937, she had covered the distance in a new record time of 13 days and 51 minutes. On November 5, 1937, the Athlone Castle was the first mail ship to call at East London. On December 27, 1940, she was commissioned as a troop carrier demanded. In November 1942 she took part, among other things, in the African campaign. In the six years that she served in the war, she carried a total of 148,113 people.

In 1946 she was used on two troop repatriation trips to Australia and one to Singapore. On September 17, 1946, she was handed over to Belfast for refurbishment. In May 1947, the Athlone Castle returned to the Union-Castle Line's postal service and for the following years sailed from England to South Africa as before the war.

Fate
on July 23, 1965, She left Cape Town for the last time. She was then decommissioned after almost 30 years. Sailed from Southampton to Taiwan on August 16, 1965, and arrived in Kaohsiung on September 13, 1965.

References

Troop ships of the United Kingdom
Ships of the Union-Castle Line
Ships built in Belfast
Ships built by Harland and Wolff
1935 ships